Happiness is a 1935 silent satirical slapstick (or rather lubok) comedy set in the Russian Empire before the October Revolution and in the Soviet Union at the time of the collectivization. Medvedkin's original title was The Snatchers or The Possessors (Стяжатели).

The original print featured an experimental color sequence illustrating a poor peasant's dreams of becoming a king. It was the first color production of the Mosfilm studio. According to Medvedkin, "At that time the peasant could not dream of anything multicoloured of beautiful. His dream was limited, and in that the technology helped". The sequence was discarded on account of its poor technical quality and is apparently lost.

Unnoticed on its release, Happiness became well known in the 1960s among film scholars. It was especially championed by Chris Marker who included some excerpts from Happiness in his 1992 documentary The Last Bolshevik.

Cast 
 Peter Zinoviev as The Loser
 Elena Egorova as Anna

References

External links

1935 comedy films
1935 films
Russian silent feature films
Soviet comedy films
Russian comedy films
Articles containing video clips
Soviet black-and-white films
Soviet silent feature films
Russian black-and-white films
Silent comedy films